René Kohn (16 June 1933 – 18 July 1989) was a Luxembourgian swimmer. He competed at the 1952 Summer Olympics and the 1956 Summer Olympics.

References

1933 births
1989 deaths
Luxembourgian male swimmers
Olympic swimmers of Luxembourg
Swimmers at the 1952 Summer Olympics
Swimmers at the 1956 Summer Olympics
People from Diekirch